The first radio broadcast in Poland happened on 1 February 1925 and the industry is still alive today.

Major radio stations 

The following radios are the largest on Poland's market.

Eurozet 
Radio ZET
Antyradio
Chilli zet
Meloradio

Agora 
Radio Złote Przeboje
Radio Pogoda
TOK FM
Rock Radio

Grupa RMF 
RMF FM
RMF MAXX
RMF Classic
RMF ON (website)
RMF Ukraina
Radio RMF 24

Grupa ZPR 
Radio Eska
Radio Vox
Radio Plus
Eska Rock
Radio Super Nova
MUZO FM

Polskie Radio 
Jedynka
Dwójka
Trójka
Czwórka

Other 
Local radios (e.g. Radio Gdańsk)
Radio Maryja

History

Interwar era 
The first message transmitted through radio in Poland was broadcast on 1 February 1925 (though foreign stations could be listened to in the country) from the station of the Polish Radio Engineering Company in Mokotów, Warsaw. The programme announced the future creation of Polskie Radio. Polskie Radio was eventually established the next year and the first words, said by Janina Sztompkówna, were:

Halo, halo, tu Polskie Radio Warszawa, fala 480.

Translation:

Hello, hello, this is Polskie Radio Warsaw, wave 480.

Local editions of Polskie Radio started being created all across the country, usually as initiatives of the places' citizens. After Warsaw, the radio was launched in Kraków on 15 February 1927, in Poznań on 29 April, in Katowice on 4 December, in Vilnius in 1928, and in L'viv and Łódź in 1930. Polskie Radio Poznań was the first radio to report a football match (Warta Poznań v. Philips Eindhoven).

World War II 
During the German occupation of Poland, radios were confiscated from citizens in order to stop them from listening to anti-Nazi broadcasts. They were also used to spread propaganda, with stations in Gdańsk, Toruń, Poznań, Katowice, Warsaw, Kraków, Szczecin and Wrocław.

Communist Poland 
As people moved to Poland, the number of radios rose. The radio became an important part of life for a person. The reorganisation of radio programs was a part of the process of rebuilding the economy.

On 3 May 1953, Radio Free Europe started being transmitted to Poland from Munich. On 2 January 1976, Program IV of Polskie Radio was created.

Late 20 and early 21st centuries 
After the fall of communism in Poland, many private radio stations were opened. The first private station was Radio Małopolska Fun, established on 15 January 1990. The first station which broadcast music—as well as the first commercial station—was Radio ZET established on 28 September the same year. In the following years, many other popular stations were opened, such as Złote Przeboje, Eska and Radio Maryja.

See also 

 Polish Radio
 Radio stations in interwar Poland
 List of Polish-language radio stations
 Polskie Radio

References